Intercooler is a rock band out of Brisbane, Australia

Biography
Intercooler was formed by members of a Sunshine Coast band named Uncle Ecstasy. They have released three full-length albums - Old School Is The New School (released 2002, and re-issued, with a different track listing, in 2006), Forever Or Whatever (released in 2007), and Time To Let Go (released September 2011).  Intercooler have also released two EPs - Goodness of the Girl, and Dance of a Thousand Promises (2004).

Intercooler was formed in 2001 when Damon Cox paired up with already established songwriting trio Phil Ballantyne, Joel Potter and Michael Caso (later replaced by Darek Mudge of Screamfeeder). They all had the same affinity for rock music and so decided to form the band Intercooler as their genre was chosen for them.

After completing their first album, Intercooler toured up and down the east coast of their home country of Australia, playing shows with the likes of The Casanovas, Dallas Crane, Peabody, Grinspoon, The Living End and claiming prime international support slots with Teenage Fanclub, Buzzcocks, J Mascis, Gomez, Maxïmo Park, Preston School of Industry and The Delgados.

Four songs from Intercooler's album Old School Is The New School were added to high rotation on national radio network Triple J, including live favourites "Goodness of the Girl" and "Leaflet". Videos were shot for two of the tracks and both enjoyed airplay on ABC's Fly TV, rage and also Channel [V]. Intercooler was responsible for knocking Jennifer Lopez off the pole position on Fly TV's buzz clip of the week, as voted by viewers.

Intercooler continued on to play the Queensland leg of the Big Day Out and Livid music festivals in 2003. Their first U.S. tour commenced in September of the same year. They supported Red Hot Chili Peppers and Queens of the Stone Age at their Washington, D.C. show plus appeared at Wisconsin's renowned Summerjam festival. The tour also included their own club shows in New York City, Chicago, Philadelphia, Atlanta and more.

2004 saw the release of the EP Dance of a Thousand Promises which spent 41 weeks in the top 20 of the Australian Independent Charts and had two songs added to high rotation nationally.  Videos for "Cream Puff" and "If I Try" both enjoyed airplay on rage, MTV Australia and Channel [V].

The video for "Carving Others", from their Forever Or Whatever album, was released in February 2007.

Their music video for "You're Not Gonna Hurt Us Again" was a Finalist for 'Best Music Video' at the Australian Effects & Animation Awards. Directed by Michael Ebner the video stars pro skateboarding star, Corbin Harris and screened at Dendy Cinemas, Rage and other music channels.

Side projects
 Darek Mudge played lead guitar for Screamfeeder, one of Brisbane's longest serving bands, from 2000 - 2003 and intermittently thereafter.  
 In 2005 Damon Cox co-founded Mary Trembles with Skritch (guitars and vocals) and Duey Coert (bass).
 Beginning 2007 Damon Cox also comprises An Horse along with Kate Cooper of Iron On.

Discography

Albums
 Old School Is the New School - Rhythm Ace Records / MGM Distribution (2002, re-issued in 2006 with different track listing and bonus tracks)
 Forever or Whatever - Plus One / Shock Records (24 February 2007)
 Time To Let Go - Plus One / Shock Records (20 September 2011)

EPs
  Dance of a Thousand Promises - Plus One / Shock Records (October, 2004)

Singles
 "Goodness of the Girl" - Rhythm Ace Records / MGM Distribution (September, 2002)
Surfin' - (15 May 2020)

External links
 Official Intercooler website
 Official Intercooler MySpace page

References

Australian indie rock groups
Musical groups from Brisbane
Musical groups established in 2001
2001 establishments in Australia